Dr. Amod Gupta is an ophthalmologist at the Advanced Eye Centre & dean  at PGIMER, Chandigarh. An elected fellow of the National Academy of Medical Sciences, he has been conferred Padma Shri, India's fourth largest civilian honour in 2014.

References

Medical doctors from Chandigarh
Recipients of the Padma Shri in medicine
Living people
Date of birth missing (living people)
Indian ophthalmologists
Place of birth missing (living people)
Fellows of the National Academy of Medical Sciences
20th-century Indian medical doctors
Year of birth missing (living people)
20th-century surgeons